Yin Jiao (ch. 殷郊 or 殷交) is a Taoist deity of the star Taisui or of Jupiter, also named Taisui Xingjun (太歳星君), Taisaishin (太歳神), Yin Yuanshuai and Yin Tianjun. In Investiture of the Gods, he is the first son of the cruel King Zhou of Shang and the crown prince of the dynasty (Despite King Zhou being a real life character, Yin Jiao and Yin Hong are fictional characters). After being defeated by forces of Jiang Ziya, he is later enshrined by him as the god of Tai Sui. In a Ming dynasty novel  however, he sides with King Wu and kills the killer of his mother, Daji.

As Yin Jiao, he is often pictured as a six-armed and three-headed man with many skulls on his neck and a golden bell in his hand, Bell of Fallen Souls, whose sound makes the enemies' souls fall off.

Investiture of the Gods 
In Investiture of the Gods, Yin Jiao is the crown prince of Shang dynasty. For killing Jiang Huan to avenge the death of their mother, he and his brother  were sentenced to execution, and were only saved when the passing immortal sages Guang Chengzi and Chijingzi saw what was happening and summoned a tornado to sow confusion while they stole the princes, taking them as their students. Guang Chengzi took Yin Jao while Chijingzi took Yin Hong. After several decades of studying, when Yin Hong was strong enough, Guang Chengzi gave him the Fantian Yin along with some other weapons and asked Yin Jiao to help Jiang Ziya and King Wu of Zhou. However, the way to the camp of King Wu's army, Yin Jiao met the evil Shen Gongbao, who persuaded him to help King Zhou to fight against King Wu, and protect the country of Shang. Having no social experience, Yin Jiao accepted Shen Gongbao's suggestion and fought against King Wu's army, contrary to his teacher Guang Chengzi's will. Jiang Ziya later enshrines him as the god of Tai Sui and part of 60 Gods.

As a deity 
In Taoism, Yin Jiao is the leader of the sixty other Taisui Xingjun. Yin Jiao doesn't govern any year in the 60-year cycle, and every year is governed by one of 60 subordinate Taisui. Yin Jiao in particular is referred to in this context as Taisui Tongling Yin Yuanshuai (Commander of Taisui General Yin). In Japan and Japanese folklore however, "Taisui Xingjun" is considered a singular god.

Yin Jiao is a malevolent, disaster-bringing god, and Chinese astronomers were said to have paid particular attention to the direction of Tai Sui each year in order to avoid the disasters caused by him.

In the Warring States period, Tai Sui had become a god/gods in the popular astronomy, but there is no record of worshiping the Taisui Xingjun in the documents before the Han dynasty, with the earliest record found in Wang Chong's Lunheng. There are several legends related to it, usually about people disrespecting or ignoring Taisui Xingjun and suffering disaster. For example, in Taiping Guangji, there is a tale of a house that was destroyed and a clan being wiped out because the basement was built without believing in the danger of unearthing Tai Sui as the underground flesh (Feng).

In contemporary Taiwan, "pacifying Taisui Xingjun" is one of three religious services protecting against misfortune (along with lighting a secure lamp and worshipping the Big Dipper). He is worshipped in his own temples, such as Shanxi Palace,  Drumshou Palace, Longfeng Palace and Zhenxing Palace. He is also worshipped as a dharmapala protector of the Jade Emperor God in his temples.

In Hong Kong, Yin Jiao is worshipped in a few temples: Tin Hau Temple in Stanley, Hung Shing Temple in Cheung Chau and Dongpingzhou Tianhou Palace.

In popular culture 

 Yin Jiao appears in many contemporary adaptations of Investiture of the Gods, eg in the 2019 TV series, played by Sun Bohao (孫博豪) and Shao Wenhao (邵文皓) in young age and 2014 TV series, played by Lai Ziyang (來子暘).
 In Touhou Hisoutensoku, a giant creature appears in Gensokyo, with Hong Meilin recognizing it as Taisui Xingjun.
 In Fate/Grand Order, Taisui Xingjun is an Alter Ego class Servant.

References 

Investiture of the Gods characters
Deified Chinese people